Ham Ji-hoon (born December 11, 1984) is a South Korean professional basketball player. He plays for Ulsan Hyundai Mobis Phoebus in the Korean Basketball League and is the club's captain and longest-serving player after Yang Dong-geun.

Early life and college career
Ham attended Kyungbock High School and played as a forward before being converted into a center at Chung-Ang University. Although his height, at just under 200 cm, is not considered tall for a center even by KBL standards, he stood out for his physicality. Together with fellow seniors future MVP winners Park Sang-oh and Yoon Ho-young and freshman Oh Se-keun, they won the MBC Cup two years in a row, breaking Yonsei University's stranglehold and Ham was named tournament MVP of the 2006 edition. They also won the 2007 National Basketball Festival (Korean: 농구대잔치) competition, the main collegiate competition of that time.

Professional career
Having been overshadowed by his Chung-Ang teammates, Ham mostly flew under the radar and it was reflected in his draft ranking. He was drafted tenth overall at the 2007 rookie draft by Ulsan Mobis Phoebus. Under Yoo Jae-hak, he developed a reputation as a "blue worker", a Konglish corruption of the term blue-collar worker and a colloquialism in domestic basketball used to describe an unflashy yet essential player often tasked with defending the post or the more physical aspects of the team strategy. By his second season, he had played in all five positions.

Ham enlisted for mandatory military service in April 2010 and was assigned the Korea Armed Forces Athletic Corps's Sangmu team. He was discharged in February 2012.

After Yang Dong-geun's retirement, Ham became the team captain and their longest-serving player. He reached two career benchmarks within days of each other during the 2021–21 season: scoring 7,000 points and recording 2,400 assists.

Personal life
Ham married his girlfriend of six years in April 2012. They have two sons.

References

External links
Career Statistics from the Korean Basketball League website 

 
1984 births
Living people
Asian Games silver medalists for South Korea
Basketball players at the 2010 Asian Games
Chung-Ang University alumni
Korean Basketball League players
Kyungbock High School alumni
Medalists at the 2010 Asian Games
Power forwards (basketball)
South Korean men's basketball players
Ulsan Hyundai Mobis Phoebus players